Symphyotrichum defoliatum (formerly Aster bernardinus and Aster defoliatus) is a species of flowering plant in the family Asteraceae known by the common name San Bernardino aster. It is endemic to Southern California where it grows in grasslands and meadows, and it is of conservation concern.

Description
The stem and leaves are roughly hairy. The inflorescence is an array of flower heads with 15–40 pale violet ray florets around a center of golden disk florets. The fruit is a hairy cypsela with a long pappus.

Chromosomes
Symphyotrichum defoliatum is an allopolyploid species likely derived from the backcrossing of S. falcatum (chromosome base number x = 5) with S. ascendens (base number x = 13), its hybrid derivative. The backcrossing produced this species with a unique base number of x = 18 and diploid individuals with 2n = 36.

Distribution and habitat
San Bernardino aster is endemic to Southern California, where it is known only from the San Bernardino and San Gabriel Mountains of the Transverse Ranges, and from part of the Peninsular Ranges to the south. It grows in grassland and meadow habitats and in disturbed areas.

Citations

References

External links
 

defoliatum
Endemic flora of California
Natural history of the Peninsular Ranges
Natural history of the Transverse Ranges
~
~
Plants described in 1904
Taxa named by Samuel Bonsall Parish